Costa Rei is a frazione of the comune of Muravera in  southern Sardinia.

It features a 12 km long beach.

Economy
Costa Rei is a popular destination for tourists, most of which are from Germany or Italy.

It has a church and many stores selling Sardinian arts and crafts.  Night time attractions include the mini-golf course at Sant' Elmo beach, nightclubs, and open-air movie theatres.

External links 
 http://www.regione.sardegna.it/ Official regional site 
 https://web.archive.org/web/20080401100100/http://www.sardegnaturismo.it/en/index.html Official Sardinia tourism site 
 Costa Rei Holidays 

Frazioni of the Province of Cagliari